Brâncoveni is a commune in Olt County, Oltenia, Romania. It is composed of four villages: Brâncoveni, Mărgheni, Ociogi and Văleni.

Natives
Matei Basarab
Constantin Brâncoveanu

References

Communes in Olt County
Localities in Oltenia